The octopus stone, Taiko-ishi 蛸石 (also called "Drum Rock") is a large stone at Osaka Castle in Japan. The stone is near Sakura Gate. 

Its name is derived from the octopus shape visible on its lower left corner.

References

Bibliography

Stones
Osaka Castle